Cantürk is a surname, likely of Turkish origin. Notable people with the surname include:
 Behçet Cantürk (1950-1994), Kurdish mob boss
 Fikri Cantürk (born 1933), Turkish painter and professor